Namibesia is a monotypic genus of daesiid camel spiders, first described by Reginald Frederick Lawrence in 1962. Its single species, Namibesia pallida is distributed in Namibia.

References 

Solifugae
Arachnid genera
Monotypic arachnid genera